7 vs. Wild is a German reality TV-show invented by YouTuber Fritz Meinecke and his team. The Series which is published on YouTube follows the experiences of seven YouTubers who have to survive on their own in the wild for seven days. They are only allowed to take seven preselected items with them and the clothing they wear. The participants have to persevere isolation and the moods of nature.

Season 1
The first season took place at the end of August 2021. The 16 episodes were published from the beginning of November to the end of December 2021 on the official YouTube channel of Fritz Meinecke.

Concept 
The seven participants with varying degrees of experience in bush crafting, camping and outdoor activities were dropped off into an unspecified lake in Sweden. After swimming to the shore each participant was allowed to move 500 meters in each direction along the lake and as far as they wanted into the mainland. According to the rules they were allowed to take seven items with them, clothing not counted. The clothes, were predetermined by their use (e.g. T-shirt, gloves, headgear, buff, warming layer, socks, shoes).

The aim of the series is to survive in the wild and in complete human isolation. This includes activities such as: searching for food, building or finding a shelter and a place to sleep, passing of prepared tasks (for points) and filming them. Thanks to the location on a lakeshore the water supply and the possibility to fish are guaranteed. All the participants have access to a sealed first aid kit, a sealed mobile phone, a GPS transmitter and the technical equipment for filming.

In the first episode the competition rules, participants and the items chosen in each case were presented. Subsequent episodes showed the participants' recordings, which lasted approximately half a day per episode, with the length of the segments per participant depending on the quantity and quality of the material provided. From the time of elimination the participants are no longer shown at least in the main part of the show, even if they decide to remain on the filming site.

The participants are obliged to daily confirm their well-being by pressing the dead man's switch. Should they fail to do it, they are eliminated and picked up. In addition, the participants have to open a sealed envelope containing a daily challenge. Participation in these tasks is voluntary, but points can be earned by participating, which plays a role in determining the overall winner.

The use of the cell phone carried for emergencies only, will result in direct elimination of the participant, and the use of materials from the first aid kit will be sanctioned with point deductions.[4]

The winner is the participant who stays in the game the longest. If more than one participant remains in the game until the end, the winner is the one who achieves the highest score in the challenges. They will be awarded 10,000 euros prize money, which is donated to a charity organization of their choice.[4]

Participants and Selected Items

Episode overview

Winner 

With 42 points, Fritz Meinecke was the winner of the first season. The prize of 10,000 Euros was donated to Robert Marc Lehmann's project Mission Erde. Chris and Mattin shared the second place due to the same score. The following places were determined by the date of elimination.

Reception 

The aired episodes have an average of over four million views. The Stuttgarter Nachrichten announced the start of the series.

After the series' launch, the youth radio program of the SWR (the Southwest Broadcasting is a regional public broadcasting cooperation serving the southwest of Germany) Dasding wrote: "The survival format "7 vs. Wild" is going through the roof on YouTube right now." Web video producer MontanaBlack stated that, "it's one of the most hyped formats ever on YouTube." The news portal Watson (a Swiss news portal) called the series "brilliant."

The episodes also received attention due to "live reactions" from popular streamers such as Simon Unge, Jens Knossalla und Rezo. Additionally, some of the participants responded to the episodes by providing additional background information, such as from Fritz Meinecke.

Season 2 

The second season of 7 vs. Wild is currently published each Wednesday and Saturday on YouTube. It is accompanied by the behind the scenes videos on DAVE's channel.

References 

2020s YouTube series